Pyu is a language isolate spoken in Papua New Guinea. As of 2000, the language had about 100 speakers. It is spoken in Biake No. 2 village of Biake ward, Green River Rural LLG in Sandaun Province.

Classification
Timothy Usher links the Pyu language to its neighbors, the Left May languages and the Amto–Musan languages, in as Arai–Samaia stock.

An automated computational analysis (ASJP 4) by Müller et al. (2013) found lexical similarities with Kimki. However, since the analysis was automatically generated, the grouping could be either due to mutual lexical borrowing or genetic inheritance.

Based on limited lexical evidence, Pyu had been linked to the putative Kwomtari–Fas family, but that family is apparently spurious and Foley (2018) notes that Pyu and Kwomtari are highly divergent from each other. Some similar pronoun found in both Kwomtari and Pyu:

{| 
! pronoun !! Pyu !! Kwomtari
|-
| ‘1, we’ || məla || mena
|-
| ‘2, you (sg)’ || no || une
|-
| ‘3, he/she/it/they’ || na || nane
|}

Vocabulary
The following basic vocabulary words are from Conrad & Dye (1975) and Voorhoeve (1975), as cited in the Trans-New Guinea database:

{| class="wikitable sortable"
! gloss !! Pyu
|-
! head
| uǏiʔ; wiri
|-
! hair
| Ǐɩsiʔ; lisi
|-
! ear
| kweɛ
|-
! eye
| bəmeʔ; pɛmɛʔɛ
|-
! nose
| tɛpʌǏi
|-
! tooth
| rəne
|-
! tongue
| asaguʔ
|-
! louse
| ni; niʔ
|-
! dog
| naguʔ; nakwu
|-
! pig
| we; wɛʔ
|-
! bird
| maǏuǏiʔ; maru
|-
! egg
| Ǐio taʔ; taʔ
|-
! blood
| ɛmiʔ; kami
|-
! bone
| bəli; bɩǏiʔ
|-
! skin
| kagole; kʌkʌǏɛʔ
|-
! breast
| ib̶iʔ
|-
! tree
| ga; ka
|-
! man
| tali; taliʔ
|-
! woman
| Ǐomæʔ
|-
! sun
| agwiʔ
|-
! water
| ʔiʔ; yi
|-
! fire
| kamie; kʌmæ
|-
! stone
| siri; sɩliʔ
|-
! road, path
| ʔonæ; ʔonɛ
|-
! eat
| waŋgɛʔ
|-
! one
| tefiye; tɛᵽiɛʔ
|-
! two
| kasi
|}

References

External links
Pyu language word list at TransNewGuinea.org

Language isolates of New Guinea
Languages of Papua New Guinea
Endangered language isolates
Arai–Samaia languages